Mamadou "Pabi" Guèye is a Senegalese professional basketball coach and former player who is the current head coach of AS Douanes and as an assistant for Senegal men's national team.

Since 2014, Guèye has been the head coach of AS Douanes, and he has won a record seven Nationale 1 championships for the team. He has also been a 6-time winner of the league's Coach of the Year award. Guèye guided the Douanes in the 2021 season of the Basketball Africa League (BAL), where the team reached the quarter-finals.

On January 30, 2021, Gueye was appointed as head coach of the Senegalese men's national team ahead of the AfroBasket 2021 qualification for his first international experience as head coach. He helped Senegal clinch their ticket for the 2021 tournament.

References 

Senegalese basketball coaches
Basketball Africa League coaches
Living people
Year of birth missing (living people)